Home for Incurables may refer to: 

 St Barnabas Hospital (Bronx), New York, U.S.
 Julia Farr Centre, in Adelaide, South Australia
 Washington Home for Incurables, Washington, D.C., US